Edmund Mitchell Crosse (11 December 1882 – 28 June 1963) was an English cricketer who played for Northamptonshire from 1903 to 1910 and was club captain in 1907. He appeared in 48 first-class matches after Northamptonshire was raised to first-class status from 1905 as a right-handed batsman. He scored 1,168 runs with a highest score of 65.

References

1882 births
1963 deaths
English cricketers
Northamptonshire cricketers
Northamptonshire cricket captains